Haslev Church is a church located in the town of Haslev, Diocese of Roskilde, Faxe Municipality in Region Sjælland on the Danish island of Zealand. The oldest parts of the church were built in the 12th century but today's structure is the result of its rebuilding in 1916.

History
The first church in Haslev was probably a wooden structure built in the 11th century although nothing remains of it today. Its foundations were discovered during the reconstruction work from 1914 to 1916. 

In the 13th century, the building was extended  to the west. The apse was removed and the chancel was extended to the east. The rounded window on the north side dates from this period. During comprehensive rebuilding in the 14th century, the width was extended to 9 metres and a new roof with three cross vaults was added, meeting the prevailing standards. At the beginning of the 15th century, a new stepped gable was built at the eastern end, a sacristy was added to the north and a porch to the south, reflecting the Gothic style of the times.

In 1870, Haslev became a railway town, attracting many new inhabitants. The architect H. Lønborg-Jensen planned an extension which consisted of building a new church which crossed transversely through the old one. The old church thus became a parallel aisle in the new cross-shaped structure and the old chancel became the east entrance. The new building with seating for 641 and an altar to the south was consecrated on 2 April 1916.

Interior
The carved wooden pulpit from 1579 is one of the oldest in Denmark. In 1967 it was restored and repainted by the National Museum. The canopy came later in 1640. The old decorated pews from the mid-16th century have been preserved. The seats decorated with the arms of the counts of Bregentved are particularly impressive.

The organ, with 36 stops, was built in 1978 by Poul Gerhard Andersen, one of the leading organ builders of his day. The font, completed in 1935, was built in accordance with plans prepared by the church's architect Lønborg-Jensen.

Burials
 Frederik Urne (1601-1658), lensmann (inside the church)
 Peter Cecilius Davidsen (1866-1935), educator
 Frede Halleløv (1887-1969), architect
 Johannes Juul (1887-1969), engineer and inventor
 Vilhelm Møller-Christensen (1903-1988), medical doctor, and medicinal historian

See also
Faxe Municipality
List of churches in Faxe Municipality

References

External links
Haslev Church website  

Churches in Faxe Municipality
12th-century churches in Denmark
Churches in the Diocese of Roskilde
Gothic architecture in Denmark
Lutheran churches converted from Roman Catholicism